Cratia is an extinct frog which existed in Brazil during the Early Cretaceous (Aptian). Fossils were discovered in and named after the Crato Formation. It was named by Ana M. Báez, Geraldo J.B. Moura and Raúl O. Gómez in 2009, and the type species is Cratia gracilis.

References 

Early Cretaceous frogs
Aptian life
Early Cretaceous animals of South America
Cretaceous Brazil
Fossils of Brazil
 
Fossil taxa described in 2009